Now I Have Everything is a studio album by American recording artist Wanda Jackson. It was released in March 1975 on Myrrh Records and contained 12 tracks. It was the twenty third studio collection in Jackson's career and her third disc of gospel recordings. The album spawned one single release as well.

Background and content
Wanda Jackson was first known for a series of Rockabilly and country music recordings during the 1950s and 1960s, some which became commercially-successful. This included 1960's "Let's Have a Party", 1961's "In the Middle of a Heartache" and 1967's "Tears Will Be the Chaser for Your Wine". In 1971, Jackson discovered Christianity, which altered her musical direction during the decade. During this period she left Capitol Records to sign with Myrrh Records where she focused on gospel material. 

Among these gospel recordings was Now I Have Everything. Jackson recorded the album alongside producer Billy Ray Hearn. It was her third production assignment with Hearn and was recorded in June 1974 at the Jack Clement Studio. A total of 12 tracks were included on the album. Included were covers of "When the Saints Go Marching In", "Pass Me Not, O Gentle Saviour" and "Oh, How I Love Jesus". Remaining tracks were original songs, including "Jesus Put a Yodel in My Soul" and the self-composed "Let This Be My Attitude".

Release and singles
Now I Have Everything was released in March 1975 on Myrrh Records. It was the twenty third studio release of Jackson's career and her third album on the Myrrh label. The disc was originally issued as a vinyl LP, containing six songs on either side of the record. The album failed to reach any notable charting positions, including the Billboard Top Country Albums survey, which Jackson's albums often made appearances on. She would record several more gospel and country albums for the Word and Myrrh record labels during the 1970s. However, these albums lacked any commercial success. The project included one single, which was "Jesus Put a Yodel in My Soul". The song was released as a seven-inch vinyl single on Myrrh Records in 1974.

Track listing

Personnel
All credits are adapted from the liner notes of Now I Have Everything.

Musical personnel
 Joseph Babcock – Background vocals
 Jimmy Capps – Guitar
 Ray Edenton – Guitar
 Dolores Edgin – Background vocals
 Russell Hicks – Guitar
 Wanda Jackson – Lead vocals
 Kenny Malone – Drums
 Charlie McCoy – Harmonica 
 Weldon Myrick – Steel guitar
 June Page – Background vocals
 Billy Sanford – Guitar
 Jerry Smith – Piano
 Henry Strzelecki – Bass
 Bergen White – Background vocals
 Hurshel Wiginton – Background vocals

Technical personnel
 Billy Ray Hearn – Producer
 Larry Lee – Liner notes
 Stan Miller – Cover design
 Charlie Tallent – Engineer

Release history

References

1975 albums
Wanda Jackson albums